The DC Animated Universe was a series of shows and feature-length films that aired or were released during the period from 1992 through 2006 and featured many characters from the DC Comics roster. While many characters played important or ongoing roles in the series, many more appeared only in the background. This is a list of characters appearing in the related shows and films. The information is broken down by production and sorted by original air date or release date.

Batman: The Animated Series

The series debuted in 1992 and ran through 1993, and 65 original episodes, under the title Batman. The characters it used consisted of primarily of those drawn from Batman related comic books, though a few were adapted from other DC Comics series or created specifically for the show. Notably, the show created the character of Harley Quinn / Harleen Quinzel.

Protagonists

Batman / Bruce Wayne (Kevin Conroy)
Robin / Dick Grayson (Loren Lester)
Batgirl / Barbara Gordon (Melissa Gilbert)
Alfred Pennyworth (Efrem Zimbalist Jr., Clive Revill)
Leslie Thompkins (Diana Muldaur)
James Gordon (Bob Hastings)
Harvey Bullock (Robert Costanzo)
Renee Montoya (Ingrid Oliu)

Additional protagonists 

Zatara
Zatanna
Jonah Hex

Antagonists

Achilles Milo (Treat Williams)
Arnold Stromwell (Eugene Roche)
Bane
Catwoman / Selina Kyle (Adrienne Barbeau)
Clayface / Matt Hagen (Ron Perlman)
The Clock King / Temple Fugate (Alan Rachins)
Count Vertigo (Michael York)
The Crime Doctor / Matthew Thorne
Emile Dorian 
HARDAC (Jeff Bennett)
Harley Quinn / Harleen Quinzel (Arleen Sorkin)
Hugo Strange
The Joker (Mark Hamill)
Josiah Wormwood 
Killer Croc / Waylon Jones (Aron Kincaid)
Kyodai Ken (Robert Ito)
The Mad Hatter / Jervis Tetch (Roddy McDowall)
Man-Bat / Kirk Langstrom (Marc Singer)
Maxie Zeus
Mister Freeze / Victor Fries (Michael Ansara)
The Penguin / Oswald Cobblepot (Paul Williams)
Poison Ivy / Pamela Isley (Diane Pershing)
Ra's al Ghul (David Warner)
Red Claw (Kate Mulgrew)
The Riddler / Edward Nigma (John Glover)
Roland Daggett (Edward Asner)
Rupert Thorne (John Vernon)
The Scarecrow / Jonathan Crane (Henry Polic II)
Sewer King
Talia al Ghul (Helen Slater)
Tony Zucco (Thomas F. Wilson)
Two-Face / Harvey Dent (Richard Moll)
Ubu (Tomoya Kawai)
The Ventriloquist / Arnold Wesker

Supporting and additional characters

Lucius Fox (Brock Peters)
Hamilton Hill (Lloyd Bochner)
Anthony Romulus (Harry Hamlin)
Francine Langstrom (Meredith MacRae)
Karl Rossum (William Sanderson)
Summer Gleeson (Mari Devon)
Gray Ghost / Simon Trent (Adam West) 
Tygrus 
Veronica Vreeland (Marilu Henner)
Thomas Wayne
Martha Wayne

Batman: Mask of the Phantasm

Released theatrically in 1993, Batman: Mask of the Phantasm continued the style and primary character use from Batman: The Animated Series. It also introduced a character created specifically for the film.

Batman / Bruce Wayne
Andrea Beaumont / The Phantasm (Dana Delany)
Alfred Pennyworth
James Gordon
Harvey Bullock
The Joker
Veronica Vreeland

The Adventures of Batman & Robin

When Batman: The Animated Series was renewed for an additional 20 episodes, it was also renamed The Adventures of Batman & Robin and featured Robin more prominently. These episodes ran from 1994 through 1995 along with reruns of the previous season. Most of the characters used had appeared in the previous season. Most of those that had not were either created specifically for the show or drawn from Batman-related comic books.

Protagonists

Batman / Bruce Wayne
Robin / Dick Grayson
Batgirl / Barbara Gordon
Alfred Pennyworth
James Gordon
Harvey Bullock
Renee Montoya

Antagonists

Baby-Doll / Mary Dahl 
Bane
Catwoman / Selina Kyle
The Clock King / Temple Fugate
Condiment King 
Harley Quinn / Harleen Quinzel
The Joker
Killer Croc  / Waylon Jones
Lock-Up / Lyle Bolton 
The Mad Hatter / Jervis Tetch
Mister Freeze / Victor Fries
The Penguin / Oswald Cobblepot
Poison Ivy / Pamela Isley
Ra's al Ghul
Red Claw
The Riddler / Edward Nigma
Roland Daggett
Rupert Thorne
The Scarecrow / Jonathan Crane
Talia al Ghul
The Terrible Trio
Fox / Warren Lawford
Shark / Gunther Hardwick
Vulture / Armand Lydecker
Two-Face / Harvey Dent
Ubu
The Ventriloquist / Arnold Wesker

Supporting and additional characters

Bat-Mite (Pat Fraley)
Lucius Fox
Jonah Hex
Hamilton Hill
Karl Rossum
Summer Gleeson
Veronica Vreeland

Batman & Mr. Freeze: SubZero

A feature-length production released directly to video in 1998, Batman & Mr. Freeze: SubZero was based on the style of Batman: The Animated Series and The Adventures of Batman & Robin. The characters used had previously appeared in those two shows.

Batman / Bruce Wayne
Robin / Dick Grayson
Batgirl / Barbara Gordon
Alfred Pennyworth
James Gordon
Harvey Bullock
Renee Montoya
Mister Freeze / Victor Fries
Summer Gleeson
Veronica Vreeland

Superman: The Animated Series

The series debuted in 1996 and ran for 54 original episodes through 2000 as an extension of the DC Animated Universe focusing on Superman. The characters it used consisted primarily of those drawn from Superman-related comic books, though characters from a number of other DC Comics series, notably The New Gods, were adapted for the show and a few were created specifically for it.

Protagonists

Superman / Clark Kent
Lois Lane
Supergirl / Kara Kent
Jimmy Olsen
Dan Turpin
Maggie Sawyer
Perry White

Additional protagonists 

Abin Sur
Alfred Pennyworth
Aquaman
Batman / Bruce Wayne
Doctor Fate / Kent Nelson
The Flash / Wally West
Green Lantern / Kyle Rayner
Guardians of the Universe
Harvey Bullock
Legion of Super-Heroes
Chameleon Boy
Cosmic Boy
Saturn Girl
James Gordon
New Gods
Orion
Robin / Tim Drake
Steel / John Henry Irons

Antagonists

Bizarro
Brainiac
Bruno Mannheim
Darkseid
Intergang
Jax-Ur
Lex Luthor
Livewire / Leslie Willis 
Luminus / Edward Lytener 
Mala
Mercy Graves
Metallo / John Corben
Mister Mxyzptlk
The Parasite / Rudy Jones
Titano
The Toyman / Winslow Schott Jr.
Volcana / Claire Selton

Additional antagonists 

Bane
Female Furies
Lashina
Mad Harriet
Stompa
Harley Quinn / Harleen Quinzel
The Joker
Karkull
Lobo
The Mad Hatter
Maxima
Mark Mardon / Weather Wizard
New Gods
Desaad
Granny Goodness
Kalibak
Kanto
Steppenwolf
Ra's al Ghul
The Riddler / Edward Nigma
Roxy Rocket / Roxanne Sutton
Sinestro
Talia al Ghul
Ubu

Supporting and additional characters

Alura
Angela Chen 
Bibbo Bibbowski
Ms. Gsptlsnz 
Emil Hamilton
Inza Nelson
Jonathan Kent
Jor-El
Krypto
Lana Lang
Lara
Lucy Lane
Martha Kent
Sam Lane
Ron Troupe

Unvoiced cameos

Beppo
Green Lantern Corps
Arkkis Chummuck
Arisia Rrab
Katma Tui
Kilowog
Larvox
Salakk
Tomar Re
Xax
William Henderson
Legion of Super-Heroes
Andromeda
Bouncing Boy
Brainiac 5
Dream Girl
Kid Quantum
Light Lass
Lightning Lad
Phantom Girl
Triplicate Girl
Ultra Boy
New Gods
Big Barda
Forager
Highfather
Lightray
Mister Miracle / Scott Free
Pete Ross
Starro

The New Batman Adventures

The New Batman Adventures debuted in 1997 as a continuation of Batman: The Animated Series and The Adventures of Batman & Robin. It ran through 1999 with 24 original episodes. Most of the characters who appeared were carried over from the previous series. Additional characters were added, with most of them being drawn from a wider range of DC Comics comic books. The odd character was created specifically for the show or borrowed from its sister show Superman: The Animated Series.

Protagonists

Batman / Bruce Wayne
Robin / Tim Drake
Nightwing / Dick Grayson
Batgirl / Barbara Gordon
Alfred Pennyworth
James Gordon
The Creeper / Jack Ryder
Harvey Bullock
Renee Montoya

Antagonists

Baby-Doll / Mary Dahl
Bane
Calendar Girl 
Catwoman / Selina Kyle
Clayface / Matt Hagen
Firefly / Garfield Lynns
Harley Quinn / Harleen Quinzel
The Joker
Killer Croc / Waylon Jones
The Mad Hatter / Jervis Tetch
Mister Freeze / Victor Fries
The Penguin / Oswald Cobblepot
Poison Ivy / Pamela Isley
The Riddler / Edward Nigma
Roxy Rocket / Roxanne Sutton 
The Scarecrow / Jonathan Crane
Thomas Blake
Two-Face / Harvey Dent
The Ventriloquist / Arnold Wesker

Additional protagonists and antagonists 

Carrie Kelley
Etrigan / Jason Blood
Supergirl / Kara In-Ze
Klarion the Witch Boy
Livewire / Leslie Willis

Supporting characters

Lucius Fox
Hamilton Hill
Summer Gleeson
Veronica Vreeland

Unvoiced cameos

Francine Langstrom
Kirk Langstrom
Leslie Tompkins

Batman Beyond

Running from 1999 through 2001, Batman Beyond was a spin-off of the other DC Animated Universe Batman shows set 20 years in the future. Over its run, 52 original episodes aired featuring a handful of characters carried forward from the previous shows. Most of the characters that rounded out the shows were created specifically for the show either wholly or as "20 year later" reinterpretations of then current DC Comics characters.

Protagonists

Batman / Terry McGinnis 
Bruce Wayne
Ace the Bat-Hound
Barbara Gordon
Max Gibson

Antagonists

Big Time / Charles Bigelow 
Derek Powers / Blight 
Curaré 
False-Face
Inque 
Jokerz
Kobra
Mister Freeze / Victor Fries
Bane
Ma Mayhem 
Mad Stan / Stanley Labowski 
The Royal Flush Gang
Ace
Jack
King
Queen
Ten
Ra's Al Ghul
Shriek / Walter Shreeve 
Spellbinder / Ira Billings
Stalker 
Starro
Talia al Ghul
Willie Watt

Supporting and additional characters

Aquagirl / Mareena 
Bane
Big Barda
Bobbi "Blade" Sommer
Bunny Vreeland
Chelsea Cunningham 
Dana Tan 
Kai-ro 
Nicole
Mary McGinnis 
Matt McGinnis 
Nelson Nash 
Warren McGinnis 
Micron 
Summer Gleeson
Superman
Warhawk

The Zeta Project pilot episode characters

Zeta
Ro Rowan
James Bennet
Agent Lee
Agent West

Gotham Girls

In 2000 Gotham Girls was launched as a web-toon featuring some of the characters used in The New Batman Adventures but from the perspective of three female villains. The episodes were posted through 2003.

Protagonists
Catwoman / Selina Kyle
Harley Quinn / Harleen Quinzel
Poison Ivy / Pamela Isley

Antagonists
Batgirl / Barbara Gordon
James Gordon
Renee Montoya
Dora Smithy

Lobo
In 2000 Lobo was launched as a web-toon featuring Lobo who appeared in Superman: The Animated Series. The episodes were posted throughout the same year. Unlike the other entries, it is completely adult-oriented with prominent graphic violence, profanity and sexual content.

Protagonists
Lobo (Greg Eagles/Kevin Michael Richardson)
Darlene Spritzer (Grey DeLisle)

Antagonists
Sunny Jim (Dee Bradley Baker/Tom Kenny)
Tubo (Dee Bradley Baker)
Fat Whutzat (Kevin Michael Richardson)
Mudboy (Kevin Michael Richardson)
Snake (Tom Kenny)

Static Shock

Debuting in 2000 and running through 2004 with 52 original episodes, Static Shock featured the character Static. Prominent characters in the series were derived from, or very loosely based on, characters created by Milestone Media for comics published through DC Comics. Later episodes bring the series into the DC Animated Universe with the appearance of characters from the other shows.

Protagonists

Static / Virgil Hawkins
Gear / Richie Foley

Antagonists

Aqua-Maria
Boom
Carmen Dillo
D-Struct / Derek Barnett
Ebon / Ivan Evans
Edwin Alva
Ferret
Hot-Streak / Francis Stone
Kangor
Madelyn Spaulding
Shiv
Specs
Talon
Tamara Lawrence
Trapper

Supporting and additional characters

Anansi
Batman / Bruce Wayne
Batman / Terry McGinnis
Brainiac
The Flash
Green Lantern / John Stewart
Harley Quinn / Harleen Quinzel
Harvey Bullock
Hawkgirl / Shayera Hol
James Gordon
The Joker
Jokerz
Kamron Stringer
Kobra
Martian Manhunter
Poison Ivy / Pamela Isley
Robin / Tim Drake
Rubberband Man / Adam Evans
Sharon Hawkins
She-Bang / Shenice Vale
Sinestro
Soul Power / Morris Grant
Sparky / Philip Rollins
Superman / Clark Kent
The Toyman / Winslow Schott Jr.

Batman Beyond: Return of the Joker

A feature-length production released directly to video in 2000, Batman Beyond: Return of the Joker was based on the style of Batman Beyond. The characters used had previously appeared in the various shows.

Batman / Bruce Wayne
Batman / Terry McGinnis
Ace the Bat-Hound
Batgirl / Barbara Gordon 
Robin / Tim Drake / Joker Jr.
Chelsea Cunningham
Dana Tan
Mary McGinnis
Matt McGinnis
The Joker
Harley Quinn / Harleen Quinzel
Jokerz
Bonk
Chucko
Dee Dee
Ghoul
Woof
Jordan Pryce
Amy

The Zeta Project

Debuting in 2001 and running through 2002 with 26 original episodes, The Zeta Project was a spin-off show from Batman Beyond and featured mostly original characters.

Protagonists
Zeta
Ro Rowan
Agent Lee
Bucky Buenaventura

Antagonists
James Bennet
IU7 (Infiltration Unit Seven)
Agent West

Additional characters

Batman / Terry McGinnis
Bruce Wayne

Justice League

Debuting in 2001, Justice League was a continuation of the continuity established in the various Batman and Superman related shows that had aired since 1992. The show ran through 2004, airing 52 original episodes. The characters were drawn from those that had appeared in previous series with additional characters being based on those from DC Comics comic books.

Protagonists

Batman / Bruce Wayne
The Flash / Wally West
Green Lantern / John Stewart
Hawkgirl / Shayera Hol
Martian Manhunter / J'onn J'onnz
Superman / Kal-El / Clark Kent
Wonder Woman / Princess Diana

Additional protagonists 

Alfred Pennyworth
Aquaman
Blackhawks
Blackhawk / Janos Prohaska
Andre Black-Dumont
Hans Hendrickson
Olaf Friedriksen
Doctor Fate / Kent Nelson
 Easy Company
Sergeant Rock
Bulldozer
Ice Cream Soldier
Wildman
Etrigan / Jason Blood
Green Lantern Corps
Arkkis Chummuck
Galius Zed
Katma Tui
Kilowog
Guardians of the Universe
Jimmy Olsen
Lobo
Lois Lane
Mera
Metamorpho / Rex Mason
Merlin
New Gods
Forager
Highfather
Orion
Lightray
Steve Trevor

Antagonists

A.M.A.Z.O.
Aresia 
Brainiac
Cheetah
Clayface / Matt Hagen
Copperhead
Deadshot / Floyd Lawton
Despero
Doctor Destiny / John Dee
Doomsday
Draaga
Eclipso
Felix Faust
Firefly / Garfield Lynns
Giganta
Gorilla Grodd
Hades
Harley Quinn / Harleen Quinzel
Hro Talak 
Java
The Joker
Kanjar Ro
Killer Frost
Lex Luthor
Livewire / Leslie Willis
Luminus / Edward Lytener
Mongul
Manhunters
Mercy Graves
Metallo / John Corben
Mordred
Morgan Edge
Morgaine le Fey
New Gods
Dessad
Darkseid
Glorious Godfrey
Kalibak
Steppenwolf
Orm
The Parasite / Rudy Jones
Poison Ivy / Pamela Isley
The Royal Flush Gang
Ace
Jack
King
Queen
Ten
The Shade
Simon Stagg
Sinestro
Solomon Grundy
Star Sapphire
The Toyman / Winslow Schott Jr.
Tsukuri
Ultra-Humanite
Vandal Savage
Volcana / Claire Selton
Weather Wizard / Mark Mardon

Teams
During the series various characters operated as teams in some episodes. In some cases the characters making up the team only appeared as part of that team, so the grouping is noted in the above list. In other cases the characters were not exclusive to the team. The teams that fall into this category are:
Injustice Gang
A version appeared in the episode "Injustice For All" consisting of : Cheetah, Copperhead, The Joker, Lex Luthor, The Shade, Solomon Grundy, Star Sapphire, and Ultra-Humanite.
A second version appeared in the episode "Fury" consisting of: Aresia, Copperhead, The Shade, Solomon Grundy, Star Sapphire, and Tsukuri.
The Superman Revenge Squad
Appeared in the episode "Hereafter, Part I" consisting of: Kalibak, Livewire, Metallo, The Toyman, and Weather Wizard.
The Secret Society
Appeared in the episode "Secret Society" and consisted of: Clayface, Giganta, Gorilla Grodd, Killer Frost, The Parasite, The Shade, and Sinestro.

Supporting and additional characters

Queen Hippolyta
Inza Nelson
Jonathan Kent
Martha Kent
Philippus
Sapphire Stagg
Snapper Carr
Solovar

Unvoiced cameos

Arnold Wesker / The Ventriloquist 
Arthur Ivo
Bibbo
Barbara Gordon
Cassandra Cain
Dick Grayson
Green Lantern Corps
Larvox
Tomar Re
Lana Lang
Lara
Harvey Dent / Two-Face 
New Gods
Forever People
Beautiful Dreamer
Big Bear
Mark Moonrider
Serifan
Vykin
Mister Miracle / Scott Free
Natasha Irons
Perry White
Ron Troupe
Summer Gleeson
Kara In-Ze
Tim Drake

Pastiches
The two-part episode "Legends" featured pastiches of the Justice Society of America, the Justice Guild of America, and a selection of their villains. The pastiche was used in lieu of the actual characters at the insistence of DC Comics.

Black Siren (Black Canary)
Cat Man (Wildcat)
Green Guardsman (Green Lantern / Alan Scott)
The Streak (The Flash / Jay Garrick)
Tom Turbine (The Atom / Al Pratt)
Doctor Blizzard (The Icicle / Dr. Joar Mahkent)
The Music Master (The Fiddler)
Ray Thompson (The Brainwave)
Sir Swami (The Wizard)
The Sportsman (Sportsmaster)

The two-part episode "A Better World" featured a variation of the Crime Syndicate of America called the Justice Lords. The pastiche was used as the writers worked on the episode, replacing the standard Crime Syndicate with a Justice League went fascist.

Lord Batman (Owlman)
Lord Green Lantern (Power Ring)
Lord Hawkgirl
Lord Martian Manhunter
Lord Wonder Woman (Superwoman)
Lord Superman (Ultraman)

Batman: Mystery of the Batwoman

A feature-length production released directly to video in 2003, Batman: Mystery of the Batwoman was based on the style of The New Batman Adventures. With the exception of the titular "Batwoman", the characters used had previously appeared in the various shows.

Batman / Bruce Wayne
Robin / Tim Drake
Barbara Gordon
Alfred Pennyworth
James Gordon
Harvey Bullock
Batwoman / Sonia Alcana / Kathy Duquesne / Rocky Ballantine
Bane
The Penguin / Oswald Cobblepot
Rupert Thorne

Justice League Unlimited

When it was renewed for a third season in 2004, Justice League was retitled Justice League Unlimited. The show ran through 2006, airing an additional 39 original episodes. Most of the characters were carried over with additional ones being based on those from DC Comics comic books.

Protagonists

Batman / Bruce Wayne
The Flash / Wally West
Green Lantern / John Stewart
Hawkgirl / Shayera Hol
Martian Manhunter / John Jones
Superman / Clark Kent
Wonder Woman / Princess Diana

Additional League members 

Aquaman
The Atom / Ray Palmer
Atom-Smasher / Albert Rothstein
Aztek / Uno
B'wana Beast / Mike Maxwell
Black Canary / Dinah Laurel Lance
Blue Devil / Daniel Cassidy
Booster Gold / Michael Jon Carter
Captain Atom / Nathaniel Adams
Captain Marvel / Billy Batson
Commander Steel
Crimson Avenger / Lee Travis
Doctor Fate / Kent Nelson
Doctor Light / Kimiyo Hoshi
Dove / Don Hall
The Elongated Man / Ralph Dibny
Etrigan / Jason Blood
Fire / Beatriz da Costa
Huntress / Helena Bertinelli
Green Arrow / Oliver Queen
Hawk /Hank Hall
Mister Terrific / Michael Holt
Orion
Red Tornado
The Shining Knight / Sir Justin
Speedy / Roy Harper
Stargirl / Courtney Whitmore
Steel / John Henry Irons
S.T.R.I.P.E. / Pat Dugan
Supergirl / Kara Kent / Kara Zor-L
The Question / Vic Sage
Vigilante / Greg Saunders
Vixen / Mari McCabe
Wildcat / Ted Grant
Zatanna / Zatanna Zatara

Unvoiced League members 

The Creeper / Jack Ryder
Crimson Fox
Doctor Mid-Nite
Gypsy
Hourman
Ice
Johnny Thunder and Thunderbolt
Metamorpho / Rex Mason
Nemesis
Obsidian
The Ray
Rocket Red
Sand
Starman
Vibe
Waverider

Additional protagonists 

A.M.A.Z.O.
Andrea Beaumont / The Phantasm
Aquagirl / Marina
Bat Lash
Batman / Terry McGinnis
Chuck Sirianni
Deadman
El Diablo
Green Lantern / Hal Jordan
Green Lantern / Kyle Rayner
Green Lantern / Kai-Ro
Guardians of the Universe
Hawkman / Carter Hall
Jennifer Morgan
Jonah Hex
King Faraday
Legion of Super-Heroes
Bouncing Boy
Brainiac 5
Phantom Girl
Machiste
Micron
New Gods
Big Barda
Metron
Mister Miracle / Scott Free
Oberon
Pow Wow Smith
Shakira
Spy Smasher
Static / Virgil Hawkins
The Warlord / Travis Morgan
Warhawk / Rex Stewart

Antagonists
The antagonists for this series break down into three types based on season and story arc. The first season had a set of episodes linked by an arc focusing on a secret government agency trying to control the Justice League. The second season had a set linked by an arc focusing on an expanded Secret Society. Both seasons also had episodes that did not tie to the arcs. The general antagonists are listed first.

Ares
Atomic Skull 
Bizarro
Blockbuster
Captain Boomerang 
Captain Cold
Cheetah
Chronos
Circe
Copperhead
Deimos
The Demons Three
Dreamslayer
The Fatal Five
Emerald Empress
Mano 
The Persuader
Tharok
Validus (unvoiced)
Felix Faust
Gentleman Ghost 
Giganta
Gorgon
Hades
Hath-Set
Jokerz
Bonk
Chucko
Dee Dee
Ghoul
Woof
Lex Luthor 
Lord Havok
Mercy Graves
Mirror Master 
Mongul
Mordred
Morgaine le Fey
New Gods
Darkseid
Female Furies
Bernadeth
Lashina (unvoiced)
Mad Harriet (unvoiced)
Stompa      (unvoiced)
Granny Goodness
Kalibak
Kanto
Mantis
Virman Vundabar
The Royal Flush Gang
Ace
Jack     (unvoiced)
King     (unvoiced)
Queen    (unvoiced)
Ten      (unvoiced)   
Roulette
The Shadow Thief
Tobias Manning
The Trickster

Unvoiced antagonist cameos

Abra Kadabra
Black Mass 
Bloodsport 
Brimstone
Captain Nazi
Crowbar 
Doctor Alchemy
Electrocutioner 
Evil Star 
The Fiddler
Fastball 
Hro Talak
Inque
KGBeast 
Hellgrammite 
Hellhound
Mister Element
The Parasite / Rudy Jones 
The Pied Piper
Sportsmaster 
Shatterfist 
Shriek / Walter Shreeve
Stalker
The Top 
Tracer
Turtle Man

"Cadmus" arc

Achilles Milo
Amanda Waller
Brainiac
Doctor Moon
Doomsday
Emil Hamilton
Hugo Strange (unvoiced cameo)
Galatea
Lex Luthor
Maxwell Lord
Tala
Wade Eiling
Task Force X
Captain Boomerang
The Clock King / Temple Fugate
Deadshot / Floyd Lawton
Plastique
Rick Flag

"Secret Society" arc

Angle Man
Atomic Skull
Bizarro
Devil Ray
Doctor Polaris
Evil Star
Gentleman Ghost
Giganta
Goldface
Gorilla Grodd
Heat Wave
The Key
Killer Frost
Lex Luthor
Metallo / John Corben
Mirror Master
Rampage
Silver Banshee
Sonar
Sinestro
Star Sapphire
Tala
The Toyman / Winslow Schott Jr.
Weather Wizard / Mark Mardon

Unvoiced arc cameos

Black Mass
Blockbuster
Cheetah
Copperhead
Doctor Cyber
Doctor Destiny / John Dee
Doctor Spectro
Dummy
Javelin
KGBeast
Lady Lunar
Livewire / Leslie Willis
Major Disaster
Merlyn
The Monocle
Neutron
The Parasite / Rudy Jones
Psycho-Pirate
The Puppeteer
The Puzzler
The Queen Bee
The Shade
The Shark
The Tattooed Man
The Thinker
The Top
Tsukuri
Volcana / Claire Selton

Supporting and additional characters

Dana Tan
Hermes
Hephaestus
Inza Nelson
Jonathan Kent
Jor-El
Lois Lane
Queen Hippolyta
Rama Kushna

Unvoiced cameos

Ace the Bathound
Green Lantern Corps
Chaselon
K'ryssma
Katma Tui
Kilowog
Palaqua
Spol
Stel
Jimmy Olsen
Krypto
Legion of Super-Heroes
Blok
Chameleon Boy
Colossal Boy
Cosmic Boy
Lightning Lad
Saturn Girl
Shadow Lass
Timber Wolf
Ultra Boy
Wildfire
Lightray
Maggie Sawyer
Martha Wayne
Mary McGinnis
Matt McGinnis
Mordru
Nightwing / Dick Grayson
Perry White
Ron Troupe
Snapper Carr
Summer Gleeson
Warren McGinnis

Pastiches
The episode "Double Date" featured a crime lord as the primary antagonist that was a mix of two DC Comics character. The character was called Steven Mandragora, but did not visually resemble that character. The appearance was based on Tobias Whale.

The episode "Ultimatum" featured the Ultimen, pastiches of characters created specifically for Hana-Barbara's Super Friends series.

Downpour (Zan)
Juice (Black Vulcan)
Long Shadow (Apache Chief)
Shifter (Jayna)
Wind Dragon (Samurai)

Restricted characters
A few characters have been cited by writers and producers as "off-limits" at various times during the production of the various shows, though they are allowed to appear in the comics based on the show.

Adam Strange
Adam Strange, was originally supposed to appear in "Hunter's Moon", but legal rights prevented that from happening. The episode's original title was "Mystery In Space", the name of the monthly comic that Adam starred in.

Aquaman and Black Manta
Characters from Aquaman comics could not appear due to character rights being reserved for a potential live-action TV series. This resulted in Black Manta's being renamed "Devil Ray" for the series, the character first appearing in an episode that was originally written to feature Aquaman.

Batman related characters
Most characters from the Batman comics due to the "Bat-Embargo" that reserved those characters for the new Batman cartoon The Batman and the new Batman movies. This left only Batman available to be prominently used in Justice League and Justice League Unlimited.

This resulted in a partial rewrite of the episode "Double Date". Originally, Barbara Gordon was to appear in the episode. The episode would have her getting injured during a case as Batgirl. Since Bruce forbids her from participating she would recreate herself as Oracle, and get in touch with Black Canary and Huntress to finish her case. Neither of them would meet her in person. Due to the Bat Embargo, the story replaced Batgirl with Green Arrow and the Question.

Some non-speaking and quick cameos did make it in to a few episodes though:
Alternate versions of Dick Grayson, Barbara Gordon, Tim Drake, and Cassandra Cain make very brief appearances in the three part "The Savage Time". Drake also makes a brief cameo in "Hereafter Part I" attending Superman's funeral.
Hugo Strange briefly appeared at the table with the directors of Project Cadmus in "The Doomsday Sanction". A larger follow up appearance in "Question Authority" had to be re-worked to use Doctor Moon.
Nightwing makes a fleeting appearance as a silhouette atop a building in Blüdhaven in the episode "Grudge Match".

Batwoman: Kathy Kane
Kathy Kane the original Silver age Batwoman could not appear as one of the three women to don the costume of Batwoman in the animated movie Batman: Mystery of the Batwoman. According to the featurette included in the DVD release, Alan Burnett explains they had intended to use the name “Kathy Kane” but were asked to change it by DC Comics, thanks to some morally gray actions on the part of the movie Batwoman. This resulted in the character of Kathy Duquesne being created for the show. However, not much later, the a new Batwoman debuted in the new DC continuity being portrayed as a lesbian. The movie however features a near identical character named Sonya Alcana.

Black Lightning
Black Lightning could not appear within the shows due to DC Comics' refusal to pay royalties to his creator, Tony Isabella. This resulted in the character Black Vulcan being created for the show Super Friends. The character Juice is a pastiche of Black Vulcan, and "Soul Power" in Static Shock is also a pastiche Black Lightning.

This also affected the characters connected to Black Lightning and also created by Isabella.  The original idea for "Double Date" was for Tobias Whale to be the man who murdered Huntress's parents.  He was replaced with a villain called Steven Mandragora, whose last name was later used for the man who arranged their deaths in the comic book Huntress: Year One.

Blue Beetle
Blue Beetle could not appear as a member of the Justice League due to rights being tied up until 2007 because of his 1940s radio show and 1980s cartoon proposals.

Captain Marvel
When the Justice League episode, "Hereafter" was being produced, Captain Marvel was set to appear as the temporary 7th member. As the rights to the character and the Marvel Family were unavailable to the show, a self-appointed Lobo took the position instead. Later in the episode it was shown that Aquaman had become the 7th member. Captain Marvel later appeared in "The Clash."

Firestorm
Firestorm could not appear as DC Comics did not allow the producers to include the Ronnie Raymond version of Firestorm in the show.

Legion of Doom
While the production team regularly referred to the collection of villains joining forces in the final major arc of Justice League Unlimited as the "Legion of Doom", DC resisted the use of the term within the show itself.

Plastic Man
Plastic Man was stated by Dwayne McDuffie to be unusable in the show despite being mentioned as a League member by John Stewart in one episode, but he did not explain why. In the episode "The Greatest Story Never Told", Elongated Man complains longly and loudly to Booster Gold about feeling left out in comparison to Plastic Man, given the two's very similar powers (although Plastic Man can change into objects, Elongated Man is also one of the premiere detectives of the DC Universe).

Phantom Stranger
Bruce Timm had intended to utilize the Phantom Stranger in the DC Animated Universe, but was not allowed to do so.

Teen Titans
The Teen Titans and related characters were off-limits due to the eponymous series. Green Arrow's sidekick Speedy appears in the episode "Patriot Act" following the finale of Teen Titans.

Vertigo characters
Sandman and other Vertigo characters were said by Bruce Timm in a Wizard interview to be considered, featuring an appearance of Neil Gaiman's Sandman character, but they weren't sure how to incorporate it into the tone of the show. He went on to say "But now, it's not even an issue. The whole Vertigo universe is closed off for us." In the same interview, Bruce Timm also states that they did attempt to use the Phantom Stranger and the Spectre but were told they could not use those characters.

Neil Gaiman on the subject: "I always loved the idea of doing a Sandman/Batman Animated cartoon episode, and we were definitely talking about it in '93, after Vertigo came into existence...I'd assumed that they lost interest. But there was definitely some kind of Vertigo/DC divide that came into existence in there somewhere, imposed from DC/Vertigo editorial and above, worried, I was told, that a kid would feel pressured by continuity to pick up a 'For Mature Readers' title and the world would end."

Canceled characters
A few characters were developed by writers and producers during the production of the various shows; however, they ultimately did not appear in any episodes or films.

Cyborgirl and Impulse
When Justice League was pitched to the Kids' WB network, the lineup originally included three young members as proteges for the League. The members would have been Robin, Impulse, and an original character described as a "teenage female version of Cyborg" (Cyborgirl). The promo, which is viewable on the fourth disc of the Justice League Season 1 boxset, is the only appearance of Cyborgirl and Impulse in the DC Animated Universe.

Nightshade
When plans for a Justice League series were originally in development in the late 1990s, Nightshade was included in a roster of prospective Justice League members by producer Bruce Timm. Plans for the original series were canceled and production moved onto Superman: The Animated Series. She did not make into the Justice League series once it entered production.

Nocturna
Nocturna was scheduled to appear in an episode of Batman: The Animated Series as a vampire, but the episode was canceled after Fox censors objected to the storyline, which would have involved Batman being turned into a vampire and craving human blood.

References

External links
 World's Finest Bios
 The Watchtower Who's Who in the JLU?
 

DC Animated Universe
 
 
Characters created by Bruce Timm

fr:Personnages de La Ligue des justiciers
it:DC Animated Universe
th:ตัวละครในจัสติสลีก